Wendy the Good Little Witch is a fictional comic book character from Harvey Comics.  Like Casper the Friendly Ghost and Hot Stuff the Little Devil, Wendy is an opposite-type character, a girl witch who does good deeds.

Publication history

Wendy was introduced as a back-up feature as well as a companion for Casper in Casper the Friendly Ghost #20, May 1954. Casper met and befriended her after stopping a major battle between the witches and ghosts. Soon, she was trialed in Harvey Hits, starting with #7. After a total of six appearances, she received her own title, Wendy the Good Little Witch, in August 1960. Other ancillary titles featuring the pleasant young witch include Wendy Witch World (October 1961 to September 1974), and Casper and Wendy (September 1972 to November 1973). Another Wendy the Good Little Witch comic ran from April 1991 to August 1994, and a three-issue Wendy the Good Little Witch and New Kids on the Block saw print in 1991.

In addition to Casper, the Wendy comics frequently feature Wendy's "aunties", Thelma, Velma and Zelma, with whom she shares a cottage in a haunted forest.  The story "Remember When" recounts how Wendy was abandoned as a baby on their doorstep.  The sisters tried to raise her to practice black magic, but Wendy consistently called on good spirits for white magic, frustrating her aunties.  Unlike Wendy, her aunts have green wartish skin of the type associated with Halloween witches. One story states that the reason for this is because witches don't get enough sleep.

Like many of Harvey's stable, Wendy is a design variation on the prototype of Casper. So are Richie Rich, Gloria Glad, Little Dot and others. She has appeared in various other media including television and film.

In other media
Wendy made her first screen appearance in the theatrical Paramount Casper cartoon short, Which is Witch (1958). She was voiced by Mae Questel.

In 1963, she became a frequent supporting character in the animated TV series, The New Casper Cartoon Show, and was voiced by Norma MacMillan (who also voiced Casper).

Christina Ricci's character of Kat in Universal's Casper movie was originally named Wendy in the script, but to avoid having to purchase the rights to the Wendy character, the name was changed at the last minute. The film does, however, show several hints that the character was originally Wendy, such as the red hoodie Kat wears in the film during one scene that resembles Wendy's robe from the comics.

She serves as a co-protagonist in the 1998 direct-to-video prequel movie Casper Meets Wendy. In this movie, she was portrayed by a young Hilary Duff.

TDK published a video game Wendy: Every Witch Way for the Game Boy Color in 2001.

Wendy also appears in the video games Casper: Spirit Dimensions, released in 2001 for PlayStation 2 and the following year for Nintendo Gamecube, and Casper and the Ghostly Trio, released for PS2 in 2007.

Wendy is mentioned by Richie Rich in the finale of Harvey Girls Forever as a potential new resident to Harvey Street.

List of comic series
 Casper: The Friendly Ghost (1952) (Harvey)
 Spooky (1955) (Harvey)
 Casper: The Friendly Ghost (1955) (Associated Newspapers)
 Casper's Ghostland (1958) (Harvey)
 Casper: The Friendly Ghost (1958) (Harvey)
 Wendy the Good Little Witch (1960) (Harvey)
 Spooky Spooktown (1961) (Harvey)
 Wendy Witch World (1961) (Harvey)
 Tuff Ghosts Starrings Spooky (1962) (Harvey)
 Nightmare & Casper (1963) (Harvey)
 TV Casper and Company (1963) (Harvey)
 Casper and Nightmare (1964) (Harvey)
 Astro Comics (1968) (Harvey)
 Spooky Haunted House (1972) (Harvey)
 Casper and Wendy (1972) (Harvey)
 Casper Space Ship (1972) (Harvey)
 Casper and Spooky (1972) (Harvey)
 Casper and the Ghostly Trio (1972) (Harvey)
 Casper in Space (1973) (Harvey)
 Friendly Ghost Casper: Tales of Wonder (1974) (Tempo Books)
 Casper: Fun and Fantasy (1976) (Tempo Books)
 Friendly Ghost Casper: The Wishing Cake and Other Stories (1977) (Tempo Books)
 Casper and... (1987) (Harvey)
 Wendy The Good Little Witch (1991) (Harvey)
 Casper and the Spectrals (2009) (Ardeen Entertainment)
 Harvey Comics Treasury (2010) (Dark Horse Comics)

Further reading
 The Spectacular Sisterhood of Superwomen: Awesome Female Characters from Comic Book History by Hope Nicholson, Quirk Books (2017)

References

External links
 
 Wendy at The Harveyville Fun Times

Comics characters who use magic
Harvey Comics series and characters
Harvey Comics titles
Comics characters introduced in 1954
1960 comics debuts
Child characters in comics
Child characters in animated films
DreamWorks Classics
Comics spin-offs
American comics characters
Comics about women
Female characters in comics
Comics about magic
Fictional witches
Casper characters